Palagummi Padmaraju, shortly P. Padmaraju (Telugu: పాలగుమ్మి పద్మరాజు) (24 June 1915 – 17 February 1983) is a Telugu writer and winner of Sahitya Akademi Award. He is known for
his works in Telugu literature and Telugu cinema.

Early life
He was born in Tirupatipuram in West Godavari District, Andhra Pradesh. He has worked as a Science Lecturer in Government P. R. College, Kakinada between 1939 and 1952. His younger brother Palagummi Viswanatham is a veena player, music composer and lyricist.

Literary works
His first story was entitled Subbi. He wrote about sixty short stories. They were published in three volumes titled as Galivana, Padava Prayanam and Eduruchusina Muhurtham.

Novels
 Batikina College
 Nalla Regadi
 Ramarajyaniki Rahadaari
 Rendo Ashokudi Munalla Palana

Films
He wrote stories, dialogues and lyrics for some Telugu films: 
 Bangaru Papa (1954)
 Bhagya Rekha (1957)
 Bhakta Sabari (1960); 
 Shanti Nivasam (1960).
 Bikari Ramudu (1961)
 Bangaru Panjaram (1965)
 Rangula Ratnam (1966)
Manchi Vallaki Manchivadu (1973)
 Sri Rajeshwari Vilas Coffee Club (1976)
 Sardar Paparayudu (1980)
Illale Devata (1985)
 Stri (1995)

Awards
Nandi Award for Best Story Writer - Rangula Ratnam (1966)
Nandi  Award for Best Story  Writer - Bahudoorapu  Batasari (1983)
 Recipient of Sahitya Akademi Award to Telugu Writers for Galivana in 1985.
 His short story Cyclone won an international prize conducted by New York Herald Tribune in 1952. It was selected amongst 59 stories from 23 countries.

References

External links
 Padava Prayanam story of Palagummi Padmaraju
 Head Master story of Palagummi Padmaraju

1915 births
1983 deaths
Telugu writers
Recipients of the Sahitya Akademi Award in Telugu
Screenwriters from Andhra Pradesh
People from West Godavari district
Telugu-language lyricists
Indian lyricists
Poets from Andhra Pradesh
20th-century Indian poets
20th-century Indian novelists
Novelists from Andhra Pradesh
20th-century Indian dramatists and playwrights
20th-century Indian screenwriters